Melitaea didymoides is a butterfly of the family Nymphalidae. It is found in Russia (Transbaikalia to the Amur and Ussuri regions) as well as in Mongolia and China. The habitat consists of dry meadows and xerothermic slopes with thin vegetation.

Adults are on wing from June to July.

Subspecies
Melitaea didymoides didymoides (southern Tuva, Transbaikalia, Amur)
Melitaea didymoides yagakuana Matsumura, 1927 (southern Ussuri)
Melitaea didymoides pekinensis Seitz, [1909] (northern China)
Melitaea didymoides latonia Grum-Grshimailo, 1891 (central China)
Melitaea didymoides eupatides Fruhstorfer, 1917 (Gansu)
Melitaea didymoides hummeli Bryk, 1940 (southern Mongolia)

References

Butterflies described in 1847
Melitaea